Pablo Gil Sarrión (born 8 October 1988) is a Spanish footballer who plays for German club TSG Balingen, mainly as a central defender but also as a right back.

He played 37 Segunda División matches for Albacete at the start of his career, followed by 87 in Segunda División B for four teams, and also had a brief spell with Sparta Prague in the Czech Republic.

Club career
Born in Murcia, Gil joined Albacete Balompié at the age of six, going on to represent all of its youth leagues. In 2007, he was promoted to the first team, eventually appearing in three full Segunda División seasons with the club; his debut in the competition was on 26 August 2007, playing 28 minutes in a 0–1 home loss against Elche CF.

Even though he initially denied it in March 2010, Gil signed for two years with Real Madrid Castilla and, in the ensuing off-season, played two Segunda División B campaigns with Real Madrid's reserves. He was featured in just 15 games in his second one (14 in the regular season plus one in playoffs, as he returned to the second level after five years.

Gil agreed to a three-year contract with AC Sparta Prague in the summer of 2012, becoming the first Spaniard to ever play for the team. He returned to his country and Albacete in the following transfer window, however, only on loan; in 2017, Czech news site iSport named him as second worst foreign player to appear in the Czech First League.

In September 2013 Gil was again loaned to his country's third tier, this time to Caudal Deportivo, and played four matches (one start) as they were relegated. He left halfway through their Tercera División campaign for Fútbol Alcobendas Sport in January 2015, before stepping up a level to Mérida AD that August.

After a year back in the fourth tier with CF Internacional de Madrid, Gil went abroad again in June 2017 to join FC 08 Villingen of the Oberliga Baden-Württemberg (fifth German level) alongside compatriot Cristián Sánchez. A year later, he was signed by TSG Balingen in the Regionalliga, one step higher.

International career
Gil's only international caps for Spain were all five matches for the under-19 team at the 2007 UEFA European Championship in Austria. The team won the title with a single goal in the final against Greece at the Linzer Stadion on 27 July.

Honours

Club
Real Madrid Castilla
Segunda División B: 2011–12

International
Spain U19
UEFA European Under-19 Championship: 2007

References

External links

1988 births
Living people
Spanish footballers
Footballers from the Region of Murcia
Association football defenders
Segunda División players
Segunda División B players
Tercera División players
Albacete Balompié players
Real Madrid Castilla footballers
Caudal Deportivo footballers
CD Paracuellos Antamira players
Mérida AD players
Internacional de Madrid players
Czech First League players
AC Sparta Prague players
Regionalliga players
TSG Balingen players
Spain youth international footballers
Spanish expatriate footballers
Expatriate footballers in the Czech Republic
Expatriate footballers in Germany
Spanish expatriate sportspeople in the Czech Republic
Spanish expatriate sportspeople in Germany